Kerim Çalhanoğlu (born 26 August 2002) is a German professional footballer who plays for 2. Bundesliga club SV Sandhausen on loan from Schalke 04.

Club career
Çalhanoğlu began his youth career at SC Pfingstberg-Hochstätt and VfL Neckarau, before joining Waldhof Mannheim in 2015. A year later, he moved to the youth academy of 1899 Hoffenheim. In mid-2020, he joined the under-19 team of Schalke 04, before signing a professional contract with the club in September 2020, lasting until 2024. He made his professional debut for Schalke in the Bundesliga on 5 March 2021, starting in the home match against Mainz 05.

On 10 December 2022, he joined on loan 2. Bundesliga club SV Sandhausen for the second half of the season.

International career
Çalhanoğlu began his youth international career with Turkey, appearing in three matches for the under-16 team in 2017. He switched to represent Germany the following year, appearing for the under-16 and under-17 teams. In 2019, he was included in Germany's squad for the 2019 UEFA European Under-17 Championship in the Republic of Ireland. He played in all three of Germany's matches at the tournament, in which the team was eliminated in the group stage. In 2020, Çalhanoğlu debuted for the Germany under-19 team, appearing in two matches.

Personal life
Çalhanoğlu was born in Mannheim, Baden-Württemberg, and is of Turkish descent. His younger brother, Turan Çalhanoğlu, is also a footballer, having played for the Germany youth national teams, as well as alongside Kerim at the youth teams of SC Pfingstberg-Hochstätt, VfL Neckarau, Waldhof Mannheim and 1899 Hoffenheim. Their cousins, Hakan Çalhanoğlu and Muhammed Çalhanoğlu, are also footballers, with the former having appeared for the Turkey national team and Italian club FC Internazionale Milano.

Career statistics

Honours
Schalke 04
2. Bundesliga: 2021–22

References

External links
 
 
 
 

2002 births
Living people
Footballers from Mannheim
German footballers
Germany youth international footballers
Turkish footballers
Turkey youth international footballers
German people of Turkish descent
Association football midfielders
FC Schalke 04 players
FC Schalke 04 II players
SV Sandhausen players
Bundesliga players
2. Bundesliga players
Regionalliga players